Vrchlabí is a town in Trutnov District in the Hradec Králové Region of the Czech Republic. It has about 12,000 inhabitants. It lies at the foot of the Giant Mountains on the river Elbe. The town centre with the castle complex, monastery complex and town park is well preserved and is protected by law as an urban monument zone.

Administrative parts
Vrchlabí is made up of town parts of Vrchlabí, Hořejší Vrchlabí and Podhůří.

Etymology
The name of the town is closely related with the location on the river Elbe, the oldest name is Latin Albipolis (Albi = Elbe, polis = city). Both Czech and German name can be translated as Upper Elbe Area.

Geography
About half of the municipal territory lies in the Giant Mountains, and its northern part lies in the Krkonoše National Park. The seat of the administration of the national park is located in Vrchlabí. The southern part of Vrchlabí lies in the Giant Mountains Foothills. The town is nicknamed the "Gateway to the Giant Mountains".

Vrchlabí is located on the upper part of the river Elbe. There are two small ponds in the area, the larger one is Vejsplachy, used for recreational purposes. The Vrchlabský Pond, named after the town, lies outside the municipal territory.

History

The history of Vrchlabí started with the colonization of the Giant Mountains. The first settlement called Wrchlab was probably founded before 1300. The first written mention is from 1359.

The most significant person in the history Vrchlabí was Kryštof Gendorf, a mining expert who developed the town into one of the most important metallurgy centres. Thanks to him, Vrchlabí was granted town rights in 1533, along with two annual fairs. Many people from German speaking lands came to work and live to the town during his reign and brought in the Lutheran reformation faith, which spread quickly in the region, supported vividly by Gendorf himself. Vrchlabí also became a place of fairs at that time. Especially linen cloth was highly desired and it was exported into Italy or Spain, as well North Africa.

Vrchlabí was known for manufacturing of organs in the 17th and 18th centuries, which was introduced into the town by the Tauchmann family. Textile production dominated the town's economy from the late 18th century until the 1930s and determined the industrial and craft development of Vrchlabí.

In 1867, winter sports started to develop in the region. The main promoter of skiing was Guido Rotter, a local factory owner.

The town was part of the Kingdom of Bohemia, which itself fell to the Habsburg monarchy in the 16th century, and from 1867 to 1918 was included in the Austrian part of Austria-Hungary (after the Austro-Hungarian Compromise of 1867). Administratively it was part of the head of the Hohenelbe District, one of the 94 Bezirkshauptmannschaften in Bohemia.

In 1918, Vrchlabí became part Czechoslovakia, when the Czechs regained independence. From 1938 to 1945 it was occupied by Germany, and was then administered as part of the Reichsgau Sudetenland. During the occupation, the Germans established and operated a Gestapo prison in the town, and a subcamp of the Gross-Rosen concentration camp for female prisoners in the Hořejší Vrchlabí town part. Nazi Germany also brought many Italian, French, English and Russian prisoners of war to work as forced laborers in the town. The town's Germans who had not fled in World War II were expelled according to the Potsdam Agreement and Beneš decrees. The town was restored to Czechoslovakia.

Demographics

Economy
Since the 16th century, Vrchlabí is an industrial town. Nowadays, it is known especially for machinery industry. In Vrchlabí there is one of three factories of Škoda Auto in the Czech Republic. The local branch employs about 1,000 people. From 1946 to 2012, it produced cars, and since 2015, it produces components for cars. The largest employer with its headquarters in the town is ARGO-HYTOS, producer of components and systems for the hydraulic industry.

Vrchlabí is also known as centre of tourism and winter sports, which significantly contribute to the town's economy.

Culture
The beer festival Krkonošské pivní slavnosti ("Giant Mountains Beer Festival") has been held in the town every year since 1998.

The Střelnice house is the centre of culture. It is a place where all concerts, plays or balls are performed.

Sport
Krakonošova stovka is a 100 km-long march that has been held annually since 1966.

The local ice hockey club, HC Vrchlabí, plays in the 2nd Czech Republic Hockey League since 2022–23 season.

Vrchlabí Mad Squirrels, local rugby club, play in the Euro XIII.

There are four ski resorts in the area: Kněžický Vrch, Kněžický Vrch – Kebrlák, Bubákov, and Herlíkovice.

Sights

The Vrchlabí Castle was built in 1546–1548 for Kryštof Gendorf and originally surrounded by the moat. It was one of the first Renaissance castles in Bohemia. The most valuable monument in the castle and the last piece of the original equipment is the Renaissance faience stove. Nowadays the castle houses the municipal office and some of the spaces are freely accessible.

The castle is surrounded by a park from the second half of the 19th century. It was originally an ornamental garden, but after the moat was eliminated, the park was redesigned. In the southwestern part of the park is the castle chapel with the Czernin-Morzin tomb. It was built in the Neo-Gothic style in 1887–1890.

The Discalced Augustinians Monastery was founded in 1705. The monastery complex with the Church of Saint Augustinus was built in the Baroque style with Neoclassical elements and was finished in 1725. Nowadays the premises of the monastery house an exhibition of the Krkonoše Museum  on the nature and history of the region, and the church is often used as a concert hall due to its great acoustics.

The Church of Saint Lawrence on the Míru Square was built in the Neo-Gothic style in 1889. It replaced an old Gothic church from the 14th century. It has -high tower. Opposite the church is located a valuable set of four gabled houses where is located Krkonoše Museum and KRNAP infocentre. Next to them is one of the oldest monuments in the town, a house which served as the town hall from 1591 to 1737. Above the brick ground floor is the timbered floor supported by four sandstone columns with Ionian heads.

The second square in the historic centre is T. G. Masaryka Square. Its main landmark is the New Town Hall from 1732–1737. It was originally built in the Baroque style as one of the first stone buildings in the town. In 1927, it was rebuilt to the Neorenaissance style.

The very oldest house in Vrchlabí is the House with Seven Gables. It is a modified village chalet with unique appearance.

Notable people
Victor Kugler (1900–1989), Austrian-Dutch war hero
Anton Joachimsthaler (born 1930), German historian
Anna K (born 1965), singer
Zdeněk Vítek (born 1977), biathlete and coach
Veronika Vítková (born 1988), biathlete
Michal Krčmář (born 1991), biathlete
Karolína Erbanová (born 1992), long-track speed skater
Eva Samková (born 1993), snowboarder, Olympic champion

Twin towns – sister cities

Vrchlabí is twinned with:
 Baunatal, Germany
 Kowary, Poland
 Trouville-sur-Mer, France

References

External links

Official tourist portal
Information about Vrchlabí in the Krkonoše Mountains
Information about the 1938–1945 history 

Cities and towns in the Czech Republic
Populated places in Trutnov District
Ski areas and resorts in the Czech Republic
Populated riverside places in the Czech Republic
Populated places on the Elbe